John Richard Krebs, Baron Krebs, FRS (born 11 April 1945) is an English zoologist researching in the field of behavioural ecology of birds. He was the principal of Jesus College, Oxford, from 2005 until 2015. Lord Krebs was President of the British Science Association from 2012 to 2013.

Early life and education
John Krebs is the son of Sir Hans Adolf Krebs, the German biochemist who described the uptake and release of energy in cells (the Krebs cycle). He was educated at the City of Oxford High School, and Pembroke College, Oxford, where he obtained a BA degree in 1966, upgraded to an MA degree in 1970, and received a DPhil degree in 1970.

Career
He held posts at the University of British Columbia and the University College of North Wales, before returning to Oxford as a University Lecturer in Zoology, with a fellowship at Wolfson College, Oxford, then Pembroke. He was elected a Fellow of the Royal Society in 1984. From 1988 to 2005, he held a Royal Society Research Professorship in the Department of Zoology, University of Oxford, where he was based at Pembroke College. He was the Chief Executive of the Natural Environment Research Council from 1994 until 1999, and in 1999 was knighted. 

From 2000 to 2005, he was the first Chairman of the British Food Standards Agency. On 15 February 2007, the House of Lords Appointments Commission announced that he was to become a non-party political (cross-bench) life peer. 

The peerage was gazetted on 28 March 2007 as Baron Krebs, of Wytham in the County of Oxfordshire. In 2005, Lord Krebs accepted the role of principal of Jesus College, Oxford, a post he held until 2015.

Krebs's career has been both productive and influential. His speciality is ornithology. His publications include more than 130 refereed papers, 5 books, and 130 book chapters, reviews, or popular pieces. They have introduced new methods to the science of ornithology, including the use of optimality models to predict foraging behaviour, and, more recently, techniques from neurobiology and experimental psychology to assess the mental capacities of birds and to relate these to particular regions of the brain.

In 2000, during his chairmanship of the Food Standards Agency, Krebs criticised the organic food movement, saying that people buying such food were "not getting value for money, in my opinion and in the opinion of the Food Standards Agency, if they think they're buying food with extra nutritional quality or extra safety. We don't have the evidence to support those claims."

Having led the Randomised Badger Culling Trials, Krebs became one of the UK's leading experts on bovine tuberculosis. The findings of the trials led him to oppose further badger culling in 2012 and he contributed to a paper on the subject written by centre-right think tank The Bow Group.

From 2006 to 2007, Krebs was a member of the Nuffield Council on Bioethics, where he chaired the Working Party on Public Health. He took up the chairmanship of the National Network of Science Learning Centres in 2007. He was a member of the independent, statutory body the Committee on Climate Change, and Chairman of its Adaptation Sub-Committee, from 2009 to 2017.

For his scientific research and leadership he has been awarded honorary doctorates by 16 universities. He was elected to the American Philosophical Society in 2000.

Lectures
In 2005, Krebs gave the Royal Institution Christmas Lectures on The Truth About Food.

Notable publications

Books
Stephens, D. W. & Krebs, J. R. (1986) Foraging Theory. Princeton: Princeton University Press. 
Kamil, Alan C., John R. Krebs and H. Ronald Pulliam. (1987) Foraging Behavior, Plenum Press, New York and London.
Krebs, J. R. & Davies, N.B. (1993) An Introduction to Behavioural Ecology, 4th ed. Oxford: Blackwell 
Krebs, J. R. & Davies, N.B., eds. (1997) Behavioural Ecology: An Evolutionary Approach, 4th ed. Oxford: Blackwell. (1st ed. 1978.) 
 Dawkins, R. & Krebs, J. R. (1978). "Animal signals: information or manipulation?", Behavioural Ecology: an evolutionary approach 1st ed. (Krebs, J. R. & Davies, N.B., eds) Blackwell: Oxford, pp 282–309.
 Krebs, J. R. and Dawkins, R. (1984). "Animal signals: mind-reading and manipulation", Behavioural Ecology: an evolutionary approach, 2nd ed (Krebs, J. R. & Davies, N.B., eds), Sinauer: pp 380–402.

Journal articles

References

External links 
 

1945 births
Living people
People from Sheffield
Alumni of Pembroke College, Oxford
Academic staff of the University of British Columbia
Academics of Bangor University
Fellows of Wolfson College, Oxford
Fellows of Pembroke College, Oxford
Principals of Jesus College, Oxford
British Jews
British people of German-Jewish descent
British zoologists
Fellows of the Royal Society
Knights Bachelor
Crossbench life peers
People's peers
Foreign associates of the National Academy of Sciences
People educated at the City of Oxford High School for Boys
English zoologists
Jewish British politicians
Members of the American Philosophical Society
Life peers created by Elizabeth II